Catherine of Henneberg (c. 1334, in Schleusingen – 15 July 1397, in Meissen) was a Countess of Henneberg by birth and from 1347 by marriage Margravine of Meissen, Landgravine of Thuringia, etc.  She was the wife of Margrave Frederick the Severe of Meissen.  Via her, the House of Wettin inherited her father's Franconian possessions.

Life
Catherine was the second of four daughters of Count Henry IV of Henneberg-Schleusingen and his wife Judith of Brandenburg-Salzwedel.

During the transition of the Coburg region from the Henneberg family to the House of Wettin, there were complications.  The testament of Henry IV gave the "new Lordship" part of his wife's territory as inheritance to his wife and his daughters and gave the rest of the former County of Henneberg to his brother John.  Thus the Henneberg property was split.  One consequence of the female succession was that after Henry IV's death in 1347, his sons-in-law could not inherit immediately; it became possible only after Judith of Brandenburg died on 1 February 1353.  Only eight days later, on 9 February 1353, Margrave Frederick appeared at the court of Emperor Charles IV in Prague, to be enfeoffed with the territory around Coburg.

The complicated inheritance rules did not match the expectations of Catherine's father-in-law Frederick the Serious.  This is reflected in an episode in a surviving chronicle, which relates how Catherine was sent back home when her dowry failed to be delivered.  Another tradition says that after her first-born son died early, Catherine wore only black clothes and renounced all jewelry until her next son was born.  Both stories are probably legends, but they do point to two unusual circumstances: the unusual succession, and the 20-year waiting period between her marriage and the birth of her heir.  Between 1370 and 1380, she gave birth to three surviving sons:
 Frederick I, Elector of Saxony (1370–1428),
 William II, Margrave of Meissen (1371–1425)
 George (died 1402)

Regent
When her husband died in 1381, her sons were still minors.  In accordance with her late husband's will, Catherine took up their guardianship and ruled until her death both her own territory of Coburg and Weißenfels (which she had received as jointure from her husband) and jointly with her sons the territories along the middle Saale and between the Saale and Mulde, which they had received at the division of Chemnitz of 1382.

As Landgravine of Thuringia and Margravine of Meissen she has sealed many deeds and she kept her own seal for that purpose.  She took her widow's seat in Coburg, where her mother, Judith of Brandenburg, also lived.  She had stayed there often during her husband's lifetime, as he had to travel frequently.

Catherine is also remembered because she commissioned Heinrich von Vippach's Fürstenspiegel Katherina divina.

References
Georg Spalatin: Chronik der Sachsen und Thüringer. Bilderhandschrift aus der ersten Hälfte des 16. Jahrhunderts., 3 vols, State Library at Coburg Ms Cas 9–11.  A complete digital facsimile of the manuscript is available at the website . For Catherine of Henneberg, see in particular volume 3, p. 215r - 218v.
Reinhardt Butz and Gert Melville (Eds.): Coburg 1353. Stadt und Land Coburg im Spätmittelalter., in: Schriftenreihe der Historischen Gesellschaft Coburg e.V., vol. 17, Coburg, 2003.
Wilhelm Füßlein: Der Übergang der Herrschaft Coburg vom Hause Henneberg-Schleusingen an die Wettiner 1353, in: Zeitschrift des Vereins für Thüringische Geschichte und Altertumskunde N.F. 28 (1929), pp. 325–434.
Eckart Hennig: Die neue Herrschaft Henneberg 1245–1353, in: Jahrbuch der Coburger Landesstiftung 26 (1981) pp. 43–70.
Johann Gottlieb Horn: Lebens- und Heldengeschichte (…) Friedrichs des Streitbaren, Leipzig, 1733.
Michael Menzel: Die "Katherina divina" des Johann von Vippach. Ein Fürstenspiegel des 14. Jahrhunderts, Mitteldeutsche Forschungen 99, Cologne, Vienna, 1989.
August Wilhelm Müller: Die erlauchten Stammmütter des Hauses Sachsen Ernestinische Linie in Skizzen und einem ausführlichen Lebensbilde der Mark- und Landgräfin Katherina, gebornen Gräfin von Henneberg, Meiningen, 1862.
Silvia Pfister: Das Huhn, das goldene Eier legt - Katharina von Henneberg (vor 1334–1397) und ihr Erbe, in: "Seien Sie doch vernünftig!", Frauen der Coburger Geschichte, edited by Gaby Franger, Edmund Frey & Brigitte Maisch, Coburg 2008, pp. 18–33.
Franz Otto Stichart: Galerie der Sächsischen Fürstinnen, Leipzig, 1857; for Catherine of Henneberg, see pp. 102–110

1330s births
1397 deaths
People from Hildburghausen (district)
Landgravines of Thuringia
Babenberg
House of Henneberg
House of Wettin
Year of birth uncertain
14th-century German women
14th-century women rulers
14th-century German nobility
Burials at Altzella Abbey